Pleasant Township may refer to:

Illinois
 Pleasant Township, Fulton County, Illinois

Indiana
 Pleasant Township, Allen County, Indiana
 Pleasant Township, Grant County, Indiana
 Pleasant Township, Johnson County, Indiana
 Pleasant Township, LaPorte County, Indiana
 Pleasant Township, Porter County, Indiana
 Pleasant Township, Steuben County, Indiana
 Pleasant Township, Switzerland County, Indiana
 Pleasant Township, Wabash County, Indiana

Iowa
 Pleasant Township, Appanoose County, Iowa
 Pleasant Township, Cass County, Iowa
 Pleasant Township, Hardin County, Iowa
 Pleasant Township, Lucas County, Iowa
 Pleasant Township, Monroe County, Iowa
 Pleasant Township, Pottawattamie County, Iowa
 Pleasant Township, Poweshiek County, Iowa
 Pleasant Township, Union County, Iowa, in Union County, Iowa
 Pleasant Township, Wapello County, Iowa
 Pleasant Township, Winneshiek County, Iowa, in Winneshiek County, Iowa
 Pleasant Township, Wright County, Iowa

Kansas
 Pleasant Township, Butler County, Kansas
 Pleasant Township, Coffey County, Kansas
 Pleasant Township, Harvey County, Kansas
 Pleasant Township, Lincoln County, Kansas, in Lincoln County, Kansas
 Pleasant Township, Smith County, Kansas, in Smith County, Kansas

North Dakota
 Pleasant Township, Cass County, North Dakota, in Cass County, North Dakota

Ohio
 Pleasant Township, Brown County, Ohio
 Pleasant Township, Clark County, Ohio
 Pleasant Township, Fairfield County, Ohio
 Pleasant Township, Franklin County, Ohio
 Pleasant Township, Hancock County, Ohio
 Pleasant Township, Hardin County, Ohio
 Pleasant Township, Henry County, Ohio
 Pleasant Township, Knox County, Ohio
 Pleasant Township, Logan County, Ohio
 Pleasant Township, Madison County, Ohio
 Pleasant Township, Marion County, Ohio
 Pleasant Township, Perry County, Ohio
 Pleasant Township, Putnam County, Ohio
 Pleasant Township, Seneca County, Ohio
 Pleasant Township, Van Wert County, Ohio

Pennsylvania
 Pleasant Township, Warren County, Pennsylvania

South Dakota
 Pleasant Township, Clark County, South Dakota, in Clark County, South Dakota
 Pleasant Township, Hanson County, South Dakota, in Hanson County, South Dakota
 Pleasant Township, Hutchinson County, South Dakota, in Hutchinson County, South Dakota
 Pleasant Township, Jerauld County, South Dakota, in Jerauld County, South Dakota
 Pleasant Township, Lincoln County, South Dakota, in Lincoln County, South Dakota
 Pleasant Township, Lyman County, South Dakota, in Lyman County, South Dakota

Township name disambiguation pages